Arthur Pellew (20 January 1878 – 21 August 1948) was an Australian cricketer. He played in two first-class matches for South Australia in 1900/01.

See also
 List of South Australian representative cricketers

References

External links
 

1878 births
1948 deaths
Australian cricketers
South Australia cricketers
Cricketers from Adelaide